Brisley is a surname. Notable people with the surname include:

 Holly Brisley, Australian actor and television personality
 Joyce Lankester Brisley, English writer
 Richard Brisley
 Shaun Brisley, English footballer
 Stuart Brisley (born 1933), British artist
 Terry Brisley (born 1950), English footballer